This list of syndicated columnists comprises columnists whose recurring columns are published in multiple periodical publications (e.g., newspapers and magazines).

See also
Advice column
Editorial
Food column

References

Lists of people by occupation